Blount County School District  is a school district in Blount County, Alabama, United States.

Schools
High Schools:

 Cleveland High School
 Hayden High School
 J.B. Pennington High School (Blountsville, Alabama)
 Locust Fork High School
 Susan Moore High School

Middle Schools:
 Hayden Middle School

Elementary Schools:
 Blountsville Elementary School
 Cleveland Elementary School
 Hayden Elementary School (Hayden, Alabama)
 Hayden Primary School (Hayden, Alabama)
 Locust Fork Elementary School
 Susan Moore Elementary School

Other:
 Appalachian School (Oneonta, Alabama)
 Blount County Career Technical Center (Cleveland, Alabama)
 Blount County Learning Center (Cleveland, Alabama)
 Southeastern School (Remlap, Alabama)

External links
 

Education in Blount County, Alabama
School districts in Alabama